Détective is a 1985 French crime film directed by Jean-Luc Godard. It was entered into the 1985 Cannes Film Festival.

Plot
In a room of a grand Paris hotel, two detectives are keeping watch. One is William, who used to be the hotel detective until he was fired after an unexplained death in that room. The other is his nephew Isidore, accompanied by his girlfriend Arielle. In a second room is Jim, a boxing promoter, accompanied by his boxer Tiger with his girlfriend Princesse. Jim is counting on a big win for Tiger, in order to repay his debt to a couple in a third room. These are Émile, a pilot whose business charters are losing money, and his wife Françoise. Émile is in urgent need of cash to avoid collapse and to give his wife a divorce. A fourth room has, with his entourage, an old mafioso who has turned up to collect old debts, including some from Jim.

While Émile is busy flying, Françoise starts an affair with Jim, who gives her money for new clothes, and the two agree to pair up if both get the payoff they are expecting. The upcoming fight melts away when Tiger disappears with Princesse, leaving Jim just her jewels.  Émile, when Françoise says she will leave him for Jim, shoots Jim dead. Attempting to retaliate, Isidore accidentally shoots William dead. Émile takes the old mafioso's granddaughter hostage and is shot dead by the "family".

Cast
 Claude Brasseur as Émile Chenal
 Nathalie Baye as Françoise Chenal
 Johnny Hallyday as Jim Fox Warner
 Laurent Terzieff as William Prospero
 Jean-Pierre Léaud as Isidore
 Alain Cuny as Old Mafioso
 Emmanuelle Seigner as Princesse
 Julie Delpy as Young Girl 
 Aurelle Doazan as Arielle
 Stéphane Ferrara as Tiger Jones

Production
About her nude scenes in this movie, Emmanuelle Seigner recalled that, "The first day Godard asked me to take off my bra, the second the panties. So I protested: 'Who did you take me for?' Finally Godard said: 'Keep your panties'. I was 17, I had no desire to appear naked in a movie."

See also
 Jean-Luc Godard filmography

References

External links

1985 films
1980s crime films
1980s avant-garde and experimental films
1980s French-language films
French avant-garde and experimental films
French crime films
Films directed by Jean-Luc Godard
Films set in hotels
Georges Delerue Award winners
1980s French films